Among sports television networks, Slovak Sport.TV is a Slovak digital satellite television platform that broadcasts sports games like tennis, baseball, etc.

External links
 Official Site 
 

Sports television networks
Television channels in Slovakia
Slovak-language television stations
Television channels and stations established in 2012
2012 establishments in Slovakia
Sport in Slovakia